Kotiyagala Grama Niladhari Division is a Grama Niladhari Division of the Ambagamuwa Divisional Secretariat of Nuwara Eliya District of Central Province, Sri Lanka. It has Grama Niladhari Division Code 319P.

Kotiyagala is a surrounded by the Bogawana, Bagawanthalawa South and Loinon Grama Niladhari Divisions.

Demographics

Ethnicity 

The Kotiyagala Grama Niladhari Division has an Indian Tamil majority (90.0%). In comparison, the Ambagamuwa Divisional Secretariat (which contains the Kotiyagala Grama Niladhari Division) has an Indian Tamil majority (71.6%) and a significant Sinhalese population (21.6%)

Religion 

The Kotiyagala Grama Niladhari Division has a Hindu majority (77.2%) and a significant Roman Catholic population (12.0%). In comparison, the Ambagamuwa Divisional Secretariat (which contains the Kotiyagala Grama Niladhari Division) has a Hindu majority (66.6%) and a significant Buddhist population (21.4%)

References 

Grama Niladhari Divisions of Ambagamuwa Divisional Secretariat